Nuvolo (born Giorgio Ascani, October 12, 1926 – October 10, 2008) was an Italian painter, pioneer of pictorial techniques applied to screen printing and computer graphics.

Biography and works

Early life
Nuvolo was born on October 12, 1926, in Città di Castello, one of the major centers for typographic industry in Italy. His parents involved him in their printing workshop early in his life.
The nickname “Nuvolo” (cloud) was given to him during the Second World War, when as teenage partisan his peers compared his quick appearances to a sudden cloud in the sky.

As a young artisan in the first years after the war, he soon showed manual dexterity in various fields, from decoration to set design, and gradually he focused his attention on silkscreen and its potential uses, working either in his family workshop or at the local graphic arts school, where he found teachers who fostered his disposition toward exploration.

In Rome with Alberto Burri
In 1949, Nuvolo moved to Rome, at the suggestion of his friend and fellow countryman Alberto Burri. Nuvolo primarily became Burri's collaborator at his Via Margutta studio,  matching his work as an advertising artist with a first series of screen printing, the first foray into the field of visual arts.

Although silk screen tools were very poor at the times, he was the first in Italy, to adopt this technique for artistic goals. He created abstract figures by silk screen, utilizing dichromate gel, adopted from the rotogravure printing technique.

If in such graphic experiments he was initially influenced by his friend's matter research, Nuvolo would soon find his own creative autonomy in this medium as an innovator himself.

The “informal” climate
Working as an aid for Burri, Nuvolo got more and more in touch with a group of informal painting artists who characterized that decade. He associated with the (short lived) "Gruppo Origine", founded between 1949 and 1950 and formed by Corrado Cagli, Giuseppe Capogrossi, Mario Balocco, Ettore Colla and Burri himself, sharing an interest for new materials to connect to painting and a progressive departure from the use of paintbrush.

The “serotipie”
Around the middle of the Fifties, the quality of silk screens improved and helped Nuvolo to achieve new results in terms of printing and graphic experimentation: in 1954, “Arti Visive”, innovative art journal (alternitavely directed by Ettore Colla and by poet and Biblicist Emilio Villa along with his brother Ascanio Ascani), displayed his first official works on its covers and within its pages.

The name “Serotipie” was coined by Emilio Villa, who found a new artistic meaning for the silk screen abstract works, not intending them as reproduction series but unique printing works, made by an industrial tool and elaborated by acrylic and other materials.
Interested on the role of causality in arts, similar to Pollock’s dripping, and focusing on various fields like physic, astronomy and mathematics, Nuvolo gave a new status to silk screen tool and its artistic potential.

Silk screen paintings and collages
In 1956 Nuvolo married Liana Baracchi and together they organized an atelier for graphic arts which flourished for more than fifty years, first in Rome and then moving to his native Città di Castello in the Early Eighties.
Silk screen printing became the starting point for a vast array of artistic applications extending into many different fields over the years such as weaving, graphic arts, digital graphics and video art, considered by the author as a private field of research and expression, more than as elements for the marketing of art.
As the critic Bruno Corà wrote, “the Mondrian and Burri lesson found Nuvolo as exponent of principles so able to create an additional zone of poetic sensibility between the Cartesian rigor of the Dutch and the epic and dramatic nature of the Italian”.

Sewing machine production
Applying a small motor to a simple Vigorelli sewing machine, Nuvolo started a new cycle of spatial construction in the early 1960s. Textiles and fabrics led to unexpected geometric solutions “mixing – as the critic Gillo Dorfles wrote – the precedent experiences of Patchwork and Ready Made” in the series “Tensioni” (Tensions), “Diagrammi” (Diagrams) and “Daini” (Deers).

New frontiers in serigraphy
In the decade from 1967 to 1977, the formal conjunctions of the “Oigrog” series,(with the anagrammatic title of the artist's name “Giorgio”), established a new serigraphic series based on the principles of fluid mechanics. The author used nitro colors giving life to psychedelic figures “simultaneously archetypical and android, as a last dynasty of golems produced by arts”.
The “Modulari” of 1969/1971 defined a new dynamic progression in symmetrical secularity of photographs created with silk screen.

Digital production
A new formal concept based on vector mathematics was introduced to Nuvolo by the developing of Informatics in the early Eighties, supported by his sons Giorgio, photographer and Paolo, computer technician.
In “Alpha 39” (1987/89) series he used binary code, forging a scientific approach which led to the “Aftermandelbrot” series (1989/1992), following the fractal  theories of Benoît Mandelbrot forcing it through a combination of “guided errors”, deviations to the formula by computer, which created a proliferation of images by colors related to numerical values.

This computer graphics production led to the work created in the Nineties with the cycles of “Circuiti” (Circuits), “Dittici e Trittici” (Diptychs and Triptychs),  “Enantiomorfi” (Enantiomorphs), “Omogeni”, until the last “Turbolenze” (Turbulences) of 1998 and “Legni Collage” (Wood collage) of 2002. The various applications of the “Genesi” (Genesis) cycle, started around 1994, which combined a particular manual intervention and a deeply pondered dialogue with video and sound based on the symphonies of Bach.

Main exhibitions and collaborations

The first personal exhibition by Nuvolo was held in 1955 at the roman Gallery “Le Carrozze”, presented by the poet Emilio Villa. In the same year Corrado Cagli organized the second show in Florence, as the painter began to participate in various collective exhibitions with the coeval innovators of Informal paintings like Cagli himself, Burri, Giuseppe Capogrossi, Giulio Turcato, Mirko, Edgardo Mannucci, Carla Accardi, Achille Perilli and Piero Dorazio. 
He participated to important festivals such as the Rome Quadriennale and the Premio Lissone, which led him to the attention of Lucio Fontana and the innovators in Milan, as well as beginning a lifetime collaboration with Ettore Colla.

Nuvolo's innovative activity was also encouraged by Peggy Guggenheim, who bought some of his works at “La Tartaruga” Gallery in Rome, for both her US and Italian collections. Around 1967 he started a long and important collaboration in the field of graphic arts with many contemporary artists like Corrado Cagli, Renato Guttuso, Jannis Kounellis, Michelangelo Pistoletto and Alberto Burri, who came back to work with him after many years for the chromatic cycle “Sestante” in the Mid-Eighties.

In 2002 he returned to produce the “esoedizioni” with various authors and critics exposing the works at the XVIII Century typography "Grifani Donati" in his hometown, alongside the collaborator Marco Baldicchi.

To celebrate fifty years of his activity Perugia and his hometown Città di Castello hosted an articulated exhibition encompassing a complete monographic study of his art by the critic Bruno Corà, “Nuvolo, the painting space between order and chaos”.

In 2017 Di Donna Galleries in New York announced "Nuvolo and Post-War Materiality 1950 – 1965", an exhibition curated by Germano Celant focusing Nuvolo's role in "radically redefining traditional notions of painting and sculpture by exploiting the physical properties of raw materials using unmediated processes" in the "cuciti a macchina", "daini", and "diagrammi" series, contextualized by works by European and American artists as Burri, Lucio Fontana, Piero Manzoni, Antoni Tàpies, Cy Twombly, Ettore Colla, Pietro Consagra, Jean Fautrier, Addie Herder, Conrad Marca-Relli, Manolo Millares, Mimmo Rotella, Angelo Savelli, Salvatore Scarpitta, Toti Scialoja.

Teaching
In 1977, after some years of teaching in the schools of arts in and outside Rome he won the Chair of Painting Arts at the Academy of Fine Arts of Perugia, where he became director from 1979 to 1984.
Under his guidance the athenaeum reached a new way in teaching and promoting arts so that many important contemporary artists were invited to and actively collaborated with the institution.

The Nuvolo Archive
When the artist died in his hometown in December 2008, Nuvolo was already entered in the small circle of contemporary arts innovators and today his works are found in the collections of some of the major museums of Italy, France, Israel and United States.

In 2015 the family of the artist founded the “Nuvolo Archive” and donated some of his main works to the Pinacoteca Comunale, Città di Castello, which now sit amongst the rich historic and artistic heritage of the city.

Selected bibliography (Italian)
 E. Villa, Nuvolo, in “Arti Visive” n° 2, Città di Castello, novembre 1954
F. Bellonzi, C. Cagli, E. Colla, B. Corà, E. Crispolti, N. Ponente, C. Vivaldi, catalogo della mostra "Nuvolo-Nuntius Celatus", Delta Editori, 1971
E. Villa, Exercitations de tire en io/cibles-formules pour les ingenu eux rayons des foetiches engeridrés par Nuvolo, Ed. La Palma, 1971
G. Dorfles, Ultime tendenze nell’arte oggi, Feltrinelli, 1973
N. Micheli, Nuvolo in Nel mondo del segno e del colore. Ed. Accademia, 1976
G. Serafini, Una generazione: Araf - Bruscoli - Nuvolo, catalogo della mostra, Città di Castello/ Fidenza, 1982
B. Corà, Nuvolo: la pittura e l'atelier di grafica dal 1952 ad oggi, Petruzzi, 1992
V. Nocchi, Sulla pensabilità dell’origine. Riflessione in margine a “Genesi” e cinque invenzioni di Nuvolo, I libri di AEIUO, 2003
A. Iori, Sei lettere e cinque invenzioni di Nuvolo, I libri di AEIUO, 2003
A. Tagliaferri, Il Clandestino, vita e opere di Emilio Villa, DeriveApprodi, 2004
M. Baldicchi, Io alle mie comodità non ci rinuncio! Omaggio a Emilio Villa, dedicato a Nuvolo, Petruzzi, 2004
B. Corà, Nuvolo, lo spazio pittorico tra caos e ordine, Petruzzi, 2005
E. Villa, Attributi dell’arte odierna 1947/1967 (curated by A. Tagliaferri), Le Lettere, 2008
G. Celant, Nuvolo and Post-War Materiality 1950-1965 (Italian and English), Skira, 2017

References

External links
 Nuvolo Archive's site (ITA/ENG)
 Exhibition at Spoleto "Festival dei Due Mondi"
 Homage to Nuvolo
 Nuvolo and Post War Materiality 1950-1965 Di Donna Galleries, New York (October 2017/ January 2018)

1926 births
2008 deaths
Italian contemporary artists
Italian painters
Italian abstract artists
Art Informel and Tachisme painters